Kosmos 2379 ( meaning Cosmos 2379) is a Russian US-KMO missile early warning satellite which was launched in 2001 as part of the Russian Space Forces' Oko programme. The satellite is designed to identify missile launches using infrared telescopes.

Kosmos 2379 was launched from Site 81/24 at Baikonur Cosmodrome in Kazakhstan. A Proton-K carrier rocket with a DM-2 upper stage was used to perform the launch, which took place at 20:39 UTC on 24 August 2001. The launch successfully placed the satellite into geostationary orbit. It subsequently received its Kosmos designation, and the international designator 2001-037A. The United States Space Command assigned it the Satellite Catalog Number 26892.

This satellite was located at 24W until August/September 2007 when it moved to 12E. It had an 8-year operational life and failed late 2009/early 2010.

See also

List of Kosmos satellites (2251–2500)

References

Spacecraft launched in 2001
Spacecraft launched by Proton rockets
Kosmos satellites
Oko